Scattered Poems is a collection of spontaneous poetry by Jack Kerouac.  These poems were gathered from underground and ephemeral publications, as wells as from notebooks kept by the author. Some poems include: "San Francisco Blues," the variant texts of "Pull My Daisy," and American haiku.

References

Poetry by Jack Kerouac
American poetry collections
1971 poems